is a Japanese footballer currently playing as a goalkeeper for V-Varen Nagasaki.

Career statistics

Club
.

Notes

References

External links

1998 births
Living people
Association football people from Iwate Prefecture
Japanese footballers
Japan youth international footballers
Association football goalkeepers
J1 League players
J2 League players
J3 League players
Yokohama F. Marinos players
SC Sagamihara players
V-Varen Nagasaki players